Marcos Ondruska and Patrick Galbraith were the defending champions but lost in the first round to David Adams and Menno Oosting.

Ellis Ferreira and Patrick Galbraith won in the final 6–4, 4–6, 7–6 against Rick Leach and Jonathan Stark.

Seeds
Champion seeds are indicated in bold text while text in italics indicates the round in which those seeds were eliminated.

  Ellis Ferreira /  Patrick Galbraith (champions)
  Jonas Björkman /  Nicklas Kulti (semifinals)
  Rick Leach /  Jonathan Stark (final)
  David Adams /  Menno Oosting (semifinals)

Draw

References
 1997 BellSouth Open Doubles Draw

ATP Auckland Open
1997 ATP Tour